The Western Illinois Leathernecks are the teams and athletes that represent Western Illinois University, located in Macomb, Illinois, in NCAA Division I sports. The school's primary conference affiliation is with the Summit League; its football team is a member of the Division I FCS (formerly Division I-AA) Missouri Valley Football Conference.

Nickname
WIU's nickname, the Leathernecks, and its mascot, the English bulldog, are taken from the traditions of the United States Marine Corps. The university has had permission to use the official nickname and mascot of the Corps since 1927, when Ray Hanson, then-athletic director and coach of the baseball, basketball and football teams, gained permission to use the symbols as an homage to his service in that military branch during World War I. The university holds the distinction of being the only non-military institution to officially have its nickname derived from a branch of the military service. Since the fall semester of 2009, the men's and women's teams have been unified under the Leathernecks name; previously, the women's teams and athletes at the school had been known as the Westerwinds.

Sports sponsored

Baseball

The Western Illinois Leathernecks baseball team represents the university in NCAA Division I college baseball. The team is a member of the Summit League. It plays its home games at the 500-seat Alfred D. Boyer Stadium and are coached by Andy Pascoe.

Men's basketball

The Western Illinois Leathernecks men's basketball team competes in NCAA Division I men's college basketball competition. The school's team is a member of the Summit League. The team plays it home games at 5,139-seat Western Hall and are coached by Rob Jeter.

Women's basketball

The Western Illinois Leathernecks women's basketball team is a member of the Summit League, which is part of the National Collegiate Athletic Association's Division I. The team plays its home games at 5,139-seat Western Hall and are coached by JD Gravina.

Football

The Western Illinois Leathernecks football program competes in the NCAA Division I Football Championship Subdivision (FCS) and are members of the Missouri Valley Football Conference. The team has made numerous NCAA Division I Football Championship Subdivision (formerly Division I-AA) playoff appearances. The Leathernecks have been ranked as high as number one and ranked number two numerous times. The team plays its home games at the 16,368 seat Hanson Field and are coached by Jared Elliott.

Men's soccer
The Western Illinois Leathernecks men's soccer team is a member of the Summit League, which is part of the National Collegiate Athletic Association's Division I. The team plays its home games at 500-seat MacKenzie Alumni Field and are coached by Dr. Eric Johnson.

Women's soccer
The Western Illinois Leathernecks women's soccer team is a member of the Summit League, which is part of the National Collegiate Athletic Association's Division I. The team plays its home games at 500-seat MacKenzie Alumni Field and are coached by Dr. Eric Johnson.

Softball
The Western Illinois Leathernecks softball team is a member of the Summit League, which is part of the National Collegiate Athletic Association's Division I. The team plays its home games at 500-seat Mary Ellen McKee Softball Stadium and are coached by Alisa Goler. The team has appeared in eight Women's College World Series, in 1970, 1972, 1973, 1975, 1977, 1979, 1980 and 1982.

Volleyball
The Western Illinois Leathernecks volleyball team is a member of the Summit League, which is part of the National Collegiate Athletic Association's Division I. The team plays its home games at 5,139-seat Western Hall and are coached by Ben Staupe.

Athletic facilities
Alfred D. Boyer Stadium — Baseball
Hanson Field — Football, Men's and women's track and field
Harry Mussatto Golf Course — Men's and women's golf
MacKenzie Alumni Field — Men's and women's soccer
Mary Ellen McKee Softball Stadium — Softball
Spring Lake Course — Men's and women's cross country
Western Hall — Men's and women's basketball, Volleyball
WIU Tennis Facility — Women's tennis

Western Illinois Leathernecks traditions

Western Loyalty
The name of the "official" Alma Mater for Western Illinois University is "Western Loyalty".

We're Marching On
The name of the "official" fight song for Western Illinois University is "We're Marching On".

Western Illinois University Marching Leathernecks

The "Western Illinois University Marching Leathernecks" is the marching band which represents Western Illinois University in Macomb, Illinois.

Rocky the Bulldog
"Rocky the Bulldog" is the costumed athletics mascot for the Western Illinois Leathernecks.

Colonel Rock
"Colonel Rock" is the live athletics mascot for the Western Illinois Leathernecks.

Western Illinois Cheerleaders
The "Western Illinois Cheerleaders" are the co-ed cheerleading squad for the Western Illinois Leathernecks.

Notable former athletes

Baseball
 Gene Lamont, Major League Baseball
 Paul Reuschel, Major League Baseball
 Rick Reuschel, Major League Baseball
New York Red Bulls

American Football
 Don Beebe, National Football League
 David Bowens, National Football League
 Bryan Cox, National Football League
 Don Greco, National Football League
 Rodney Harrison, National Football League
 Edgerton Hartwell, National Football League
 Frisman Jackson, National Football League
 William James, National Football League
 Rob Lazeo, Canadian Football League
 Jeff Loots, Arena Football League
 Bruce McCray, National Football League
 Mike McEachern, Canadian Football League
 Russ Michna, Canadian Football League
 Peter Mueller, Canadian Football League
 J.R. Niklos, National Football League
 Mike Scifres, National Football League
 Rich Seubert, National Football League
 Aaron Stecker, National Football League
 Mike Wagner, National Football League
 Jason Williams, National Football League
 Frank Winters, National Football League

Soccer
 Kosuke Kimura, Major League Soccer

Track
 Lee Calhoun, Olympic gold medal winner

References

External links
Official website